Tero Seppälä  (born 25 January 1996) is a Finnish biathlete who competes internationally. 

Seppälä's best result in the Biathlon World Cup is 5th, which he has achieved twice during the season 2021-2022. The first time was in the pursuit in Östersund and the second time was in the sprint in Ruhpolding.
 
He participated in the 2018 Winter Olympics.

Biathlon results
All results are sourced from the International Biathlon Union.

Olympic Games
0 medals

World Championships
0 medals

*During Olympic seasons competitions are only held for those events not included in the Olympic program.
**The single mixed relay was added as an event in 2019.

References

External links

1996 births
Living people
Finnish male biathletes
Olympic biathletes of Finland
Biathletes at the 2018 Winter Olympics
Biathletes at the 2022 Winter Olympics
People from Järvenpää
Sportspeople from Uusimaa